OpenEdge Advanced Business Language, or OpenEdge ABL for short, is a business application development language created and maintained by Progress Software Corporation (PSC). The language, typically classified as a fourth-generation programming language, uses an English-like syntax to simplify software development. The language was called PROGRESS or Progress 4GL up until version 9, but in 2006 PSC changed the name to OpenEdge Advanced Business Language (OpenEdge ABL) in order to overcome a presumed industry perception that 4GLs were less capable than other languages. A subset of the language, called SpeedScript, is used in the development of web applications.

OpenEdge ABL helps developers to develop applications optionally using its own integrated relational database and programming tool. These applications are portable across computing systems and allow access to various popular data sources without having to learn the underlying data access methods. This means that the end-user of these products can be unaware of the underlying architecture.

By combining a fourth generation language and relational database, OpenEdge ABL allows the use of the Rapid Application Development (RAD) model for developing software. A programmer and even end users can do rapid prototyping using the integrated and GUI tools of the development environment.

OpenEdge can be used for:
 Microsoft Windows GUI (Graphical User Interface)
 WWW Programming (UNIX and Windows)
 CHUI (CHaracter User Interface) (UNIX and Windows)
 JSON and XML appserver programming (UNIX and Windows)
 as well background process programming (UNIX and Windows).

History
The original Progress 4GL was designed (in 1981) as an architecture independent language and integrated database system that could be used by non-experts to develop business applications by people who were not computer scientists but were knowledgeable in their business domain.  At the time, business applications were often written in COBOL (for machines like corporate IBM mainframes) and sometimes in C (for departmental minicomputers running the UNIX operating system).  When the IBM PC became popular, it developed a need for business software that could be used on those and other inexpensive computers.  The Progress system was created to be used on both IBM PC machines running DOS and on a variety of computers that could run UNIX and minicomputer operating systems such as OpenVMS.

Syntax and semantics

Progress ABL is a strongly typed, late-bound, English-like programming language. Although initially designed as a procedural language, starting with version 10.1 it was enhanced with object-oriented grammar elements, which can be mixed with the original procedural style. A block of code may have a transaction scoped to it, in which case database changes will be committed when it completes. An error raised within such a block will undo these changes. These defaults may be overridden by the programmer.

Simple programs run without a Graphical User Interface, but there is syntax to create one programmatically; or programmers can use the provided tools to build one.

Examples

Hello World

The following ABL code creates a window with the text "Hello, World!" and a button labelled "OK".
DEFINE VARIABLE w AS HANDLE NO-UNDO.

CREATE WINDOW w ASSIGN 
    WIDTH = 50
    HEIGHT = 5
    MESSAGE-AREA = FALSE
    STATUS-AREA = FALSE.   

CURRENT-WINDOW = w.

DEFINE BUTTON btnOK LABEL "OK" SIZE 12 BY 1.2.
FORM 
    "Hello World!" VIEW-AS TEXT AT COL 20 ROW 2
    btnOK AT COL 20 ROW 4
    WITH FRAME f SIZE 50 BY 5 NO-BOX THREE-D.

VIEW FRAME f.
ENABLE btnOK WITH FRAME f.
WAIT-FOR "CHOOSE" OF btnOK.
DELETE OBJECT w.

A message-box can be used to achieve the same effect:
MESSAGE "Hello World!"
    VIEW-AS ALERT-BOX INFO BUTTONS OK.
Also, you can use ERROR and WARNING instead of INFO to change the message icons.

The simplest "Hello, World" program, though, is this:
DISPLAY "Hello ".

SQL SELECT equivalent

The SQL statement:
SELECT * FROM customer;
(along with your chosen language connection and display procedures) can be expressed in Progress / ABL as:
FOR EACH customer NO-LOCK:
    DISPLAY customer.
END.

SQL UPDATE equivalent

The SQL statement:
UPDATE customer 
    SET salesman = 'Fred'
    WHERE custno = 14;
(again, along with your chosen language connection and display procedures) can be expressed in Progress / ABL as:
FOR EACH customer WHERE customer.custno = 14 EXCLUSIVE-LOCK:
    ASSIGN customer.salesman = 'Fred'.
END.
..
(Some assumptions have been made about indexing, locking and transaction scoping in order to keep this example simple.)

The language is record based other than set of records based.  In SQL operations work on a set of records, in the ABL, the operation is applied to a record at a time - much like using a cursor in SQL.

Application areas

The language is used in a wide variety of application areas, some examples:

 Loan Origination at US Banks 
 Rental Car Reservation Systems
 Wholesale Distribution
 Warehouse Systems
 Transportation Systems
 Commercial Service Force Dispatching
 Security Card Systems
 Gaming Systems (think Las Vegas, not video)
 Retail Point-of-Sale Systems (notably, that of Micro Center)

Notes

References

 Sadd, J. OpenEdge Development: Progress 4GL Handbook, Progress Software Corporation, 
 Kassabgi, G. Special Edition : Using Progress, Que Publishing,

External links 

 Official Website
 Progress 4GL Documentations
 OpenEdge Community
 OpenEdge Resource Hub
 What’s New in OpenEdge
 Getting started with progress-4gl

Object-oriented programming languages
Fourth-generation programming languages
Data-centric programming languages
Articles with example code
Database-related software for Linux